Susanne Lüscher is a Swiss orienteering competitor. She won a bronze medal in the relay at the 1985 World Orienteering Championships in Bendigo, Victoria.

References

Year of birth missing (living people)
Living people
Swiss orienteers
Female orienteers
Foot orienteers
World Orienteering Championships medalists
20th-century Swiss women